Tosato  is an Italian surname. Notable people with the surname include:

 Giovanna Tosato (born  1949), Italian physician-scientist and cancer researcher
 Mario Tosato (1930–1996), Italian racing cyclist
 Paolo Tosato (born 1972), Italian politician

Italian-language surnames